2'-N-acetylparomamine deacetylase (btrD (gene), neoL (gene), kanN (gene)) is an enzyme with systematic name 2'-N-acetylparomamine hydrolase (acetate-forming). This enzyme catalyses the following chemical reaction

 2'-N-acetylparomamine + H2O  paromamine + acetate

This enzyme takes part in the biosynthetic pathways of several clinically important aminocyclitol antibiotics, including kanamycin, butirosin, neomycin and ribostamycin.

References

External links 
 

EC 3.5.1